Crassus usually refers to Marcus Licinius Crassus (115–53 BC), one of the members of the First Triumvirate of the Roman Republic.

Crassus may also refer to:

People

Ancient Romans
 Lucius Licinius Crassus, Roman orator
 Marcus Licinius Crassus (disambiguation), Romans
 Publius Licinius Crassus (disambiguation), Romans
 Publius Canidius Crassus
 Appius Claudius Crassus
 Titus Otacilius Crassus

Others
 Petrus Crassus, the 11th-century jurist
 William Crassus, the 13th-century Anglo-Norman

Zoology
 Battus crassus
 Anguillicoloides crassus
 Pseudophoxinus crassus
 Hoplobatrachus crassus
 Turbo crassus
 Onobops crassus
 Neolamprologus crassus
 Zabrus crassus
 Elaphropus crassus
 Copelatus crassus
 Crassus, a species name

See also